Sphenophorus cultrirostris is species of beetle in the family Curculionidae found in North America. The name was proposed to replace the supposed junior homonym Sphenophorus compressirostris (Germar, 1823), which not only had date priority over Calandra compressirostra Say but also a differently composed specific epithet. The homonymy was maintained nevertheless because the original spelling did not prevail.

References

Dryophthorinae
Beetles described in 1838